Differentiated instruction and assessment, also known as differentiated learning or, in education, simply, differentiation, is a framework or philosophy for effective teaching that involves providing all students within their diverse classroom community of learners a range of different avenues for understanding new information (often in the same classroom) in terms of: acquiring content; processing, constructing, or making sense of ideas; and developing teaching materials and assessment measures so that all students within a classroom can learn effectively, regardless of differences in their ability.Differentiated instruction means using different tools, content, and due process in order to successfully reach all individuals. Differentiated instruction, according to Carol Ann Tomlinson, is the process of "ensuring that what a student learns, how he or she learns it, and how the student demonstrates what he or she has learned is a match for that student's readiness level, interests, and preferred mode of learning." According to Boelens et al. (2018), differentiation can be on two different levels: the administration level and the classroom level. The administration level takes the socioeconomic status and gender of students into consideration. At the classroom level, differentiation revolves around content, processing, product, and effects. On the content level, teachers adapt what they are teaching to meet the needs of students. This can mean making content more challenging or simplified for students based on their levels. The process of learning can be differentiated as well. Teachers may choose to teach individually at a time, assign problems to small groups, partners or the whole group depending on the needs of the students. By differentiating product, teachers decide how students will present what they have learned. This may take the form of videos, graphic organizers, photo presentations, writing, and oral presentations. All these take place in a safe classroom environment where students feel respected and valued—effects.

When language is the factor for differention, Echevarria et al. (2017), proponents of the Sheltered Instruction Observation Protocol (SIOP) strongly supports and guides teachers to differentiate instruction to English as a Second Language Learners (ELLs) who have a range of learning ability levels—beginning, intermediate and advanced. Here, differentiated instruction will mean adapting a whole new instructional strategy that a teacher of a typical classroom of native speakers of English would not have a need to.

Differentiated classrooms have also been described as ones that respond to student variety in readiness levels, interests, and learning profiles. It is a classroom that includes and allows all students to be successful. To do this, a teacher sets different expectations for task completion for students, specifically based upon their individual needs. Teachers can differentiate in four ways: 1) through content, 2) process, 3) product, and 4) learning environment based on the individual learner. Differentiation stems from beliefs about differences among learners, how they learn, learning preferences, and individual interests (Algozzine & Anderson, 2007). Therefore, differentiation is an organized, yet flexible way of proactively adjusting teaching and learning methods to accommodate each child's learning needs and preferences to achieve maximum growth as a learner.

Pre-assessment
An important part of differentiated instruction and assessment is determining what students already know so as not to cover material students have mastered, or use methods that would be ineffective for students. The goal of pre-assessment is to determine a student's knowledge, understanding and skill prior to the unit of study. These are assessments for learning and include diagnostic or pre-assessments that the teacher uses to help guide instruction and benefit each learner. They are informal and provide qualitative feedback to teachers and students to address strengths and needs during the unit. Pre-assessments should be conducted several weeks before the unit of study and should not be graded. Chapman and King (2005) note that when "teachers strategically administer pre-assessments before planning their lessons, they can address the students' strengths and needs during instruction." Pre-assessment can be conducted in two ways: 1) by identifying learning preferences and interests (i.e. Gardner's Multiple Intelligence test, or Visual, Auditory, or Kinesthetic learner), and 2) by identifying knowledge of student understandings (i.e. checklists, quizzes, class discussion, portfolios, entry/exit cards, anticipation guides, journals, self-reflections). Both of these types of pre-assessment are used to design student tasks, particularly when a student might require support, enrichment, or have different learning styles, intelligence, or interests. Teachers can also determine, locate, and compile appropriate resources and decide timelines/priorities for upcoming units.

The goal of differentiated instruction is to develop engaging tasks that challenge and enhance learning for each student. Instructional activities are flexible and based and evaluated on content, process, product, and learning environment. This instructional approach and choice of content are driven by the data from students' assessment results and from the outcomes of other screening tools. Pre-assessments can gather information about each student's strengths, comforts, or areas of weakness. This leads to appropriate differentiation that accommodates each student's learning needs and preferences. Assessments should be used as a tool to create clear and meaningful instruction that guides each student towards challenging but not frustrating activities.

Ongoing assessment
Assessment is the process of gathering information from a variety of sources such as assignments, teacher observations, class discussions, and tests and quizzes. Teachers must assess regularly to inform instructional strategies, learn about each student's readiness, interests, and learning preferences and to improve student learning. This information can be gathered through diagnostic (pre-assessments), formative, and summative assessments, as well as Individual Education Plans, Ontario Student Records, student interest surveys, and multiple intelligence or learning style inventories.

Assessment for learning not only includes diagnostic or pre-assessment measures but also formative assessment. Formative assessments are used during a unit to provide understanding about what the student is learning, and continually guide instructional decisions. Assessment as learning takes place when students self-assess their work and reflect on their growth as learners. Differentiation can be used when applying, demonstrating, extending knowledge, or practicing skills and attitudes to monitor achievement of goals. This might include peer/ self-assessments, and peer/teacher conferences. Assessment of learning is the culminating task or summative assessment, which takes place after the learning has occurred and students can show what concepts and/or skills they learned. Differentiation can also be used here through a variety of strategies such as tests, projects, demonstrations, writing performances, and more.

All these ongoing assessments help the teacher know students and their needs so they can select effective teaching and learning strategies and interventions that maximize student achievement. Consistent program review and diagnosis of whole-class and individual student responses not only provides ongoing feedback to enhance teaching and learning for teachers but students and parents as well. Teachers use ongoing assessments to gather information about a student's knowledge and capabilities, to direct future planning, to monitor student progress, and to evaluate student achievement. Students and parents can also use these assessments to reflect and understand their own learning preferences and level of achievement.

Content
The content of lessons may be differentiated based on what students already know. The most basic content of a lesson should cover the standards of learning set by the district or state. Some students in a class may be completely unfamiliar with the concepts in a lesson, some students may have partial mastery of the content – or display mistaken ideas about the content, and some students may show mastery of the content before the lesson begins. The teacher may differentiate the content by designing activities for groups of students that cover different areas of Bloom's taxonomy. For example, students who are unfamiliar with the concepts may be required to complete tasks on the lower levels of Bloom's taxonomy: knowledge, comprehension, and application. Students with partial mastery may be asked to complete tasks in the application, analysis and evaluation areas, and students who have high levels of mastery may be asked to complete tasks in evaluation and synthesis.

When teachers differentiate content, they may adapt what they want students to learn or how students access the knowledge, understanding, and skills (Anderson, 2007). In these instances, educators are not varying student objectives or lowering performance standards for students. They use different texts, novels, or short stories at a reading level appropriate for each individual student. Another example would be including visuals, maps, or graphic organizers to introduce or reinforce concepts as opposed to only providing written or oral text. This provides students with different methods of viewing, considering and absorbing content. Teachers can also use flexible groups and have students assigned to like groups listening to audiobooks or accessing specific internet sources. Students could have a choice to work in pairs, groups, or individually, but all students are working towards the same standards and objectives.

Understanding by Design
Understanding by Design (UbD), which was developed by Grant Wiggins is an educational strategy that may be used to inform content in a differentiated classroom. This model was further refined by Carol Ann Tomlinson and Jay McTighe, who maintained that UbD and differentiated instruction (DI) form an essential partnership. Their position is that learning occurs not at the individual level or to the individual but within the individuals students as they are engaged in exploring concepts. The combination of UbD and differentiated instruction is expected to allow educators to simultaneously "craft powerful curriculum in a standards-dominated era and ensure academic success for the full spectrum of learners.

UbD is described as a backward design model that emphasizes the beginning with the end in mind. Here, planning the courses, units, and individual lessons are undertaken based on the desired result. For instance, when teaching a literary piece, the teacher first decides the goal and how the students will be assessed to determine if such goal is achieved. The framework also recognizes the importance of assessment and employs evaluative or summative assessment models as the bases of grading.

Process
To understand how students learn and what they know, pre-assessment and ongoing assessment are essential. This provides feedback for both teacher and student, with the ultimate goal of improving student learning. Delivery of instruction in the past often followed a "one size fits all" approach. In contrast, differentiation is individually student centered, with a focus on appropriate instructional and assessment tools that are fair, flexible, challenging, and engage students in the curriculum in meaningful ways.

Students vary in culture, socioeconomic status, language, gender, motivation, ability, disability, learning styles, personal interests and more, and teachers must be aware of these varieties as they plan in accordance with the curricula. By considering varied learning needs, teachers can develop personalized instruction so that all children in the classroom can learn effectively.

The process of how the material in a lesson is learned may be differentiated for students based on their learning styles, taking into account what standards of performance are required for the age level. This stage of differentiation allows students to learn based either on what method is easiest for them to gain knowledge, or what may challenge them most: some students may prefer to read about a topic (or may require practice in reading), and others may prefer to listen (or require practice in listening), or acquire knowledge by manipulating objects associated with the content. Information may be presented in multiple ways by the teacher, and may be based on any available methods or materials. Many teachers use areas of Multiple Intelligences to provide learning opportunities.

Commonalities in the assessment results lead to grouping practices that are designed to meet the students' needs. "How" a teacher plans to deliver the instruction is based on assessment results that show the needs, learning styles, interests, and levels of prior knowledge. The grouping practices must be flexible, as groups change with regard to the need that must be addressed. Regardless of whether the differentiation of instruction is based upon student readiness, interests, or needs, the dynamic flow of grouping and regrouping is one of the foundations of differentiated instruction. It is important for a differentiated classroom to allow some students to work alone, if this is their best modality for a particular task. (Nunley, 2004)

Differentiating by process refers to how a student comes to understand and assimilate facts, concepts and skills (Anderson, 2007). After teaching a lesson, a teacher might break students into small "ability" groups based on their readiness. The teacher would then give each group a series of questions, based on each group's appropriate level of readiness-skills, related to the objectives of the lesson. Another way to group the students could be based on the students' learning styles. The main idea behind this is that students are at different levels and learn in different ways, so a teacher can't teach them all the same way.

Another model of differentiation, layered curriculum, offers student a choice of assignments but requires that they demonstrate learning to pass the assignment. This eliminates the need for pre-assessment and is useful for teachers with large class loads, such as in high school (Nunley, 2004).

Product
The product is essentially what the student produces at the end of the lesson to demonstrate the mastery of the content: tests, evaluations, projects, reports, or other activities. Based on students' skill levels and educational standards, teachers may assign students to complete activities that demonstrate mastery of an educational concept (writing a report), or in a method the student prefers (composing an original song about the content, or building a 3-dimensional object that explains mastery of concepts in the lesson or unit). The product is an integral component of the differentiated model, as preparation of the assessments determines both the 'what' and 'how' of instruction delivery.

When an educator differentiates by product or performance, they are affording students various ways of demonstrating what they have learned from the lesson or unit (Anderson, 2007; Nunley, 2006). It is done by using menu unit sheets, choice boards or open-ended lists of final product options. It is meant to allow students to show what they learned based on their learning preferences, interests and strengths.

Examples of differentiated structures include Layered Curriculum, tiered instruction, tic-tac-toe extension menus, Curry/Samara models, RAFT writing activities, and similar designs. (See external links below.)

In differentiated instruction, teachers respond to students' readiness, instructional needs, interests and learning preferences and provide opportunities for students to work in varied instructional formats. A classroom that utilizes differentiated instruction is a learner-responsive, teacher-facilitated classroom where all students have the opportunity to meet curriculum foundation objectives. Lessons may be on inquiry based, problem based and project based instruction.

While significant research has shown the effectiveness of product based differentiated instruction at primary and secondary level, effective use has also been demonstrated in higher education in some circumstances.

Learning environment
Differentiating through the environment is important as it creates the conditions for optimal learning to take place. According to Tomlinson (2003), "Environment will support or deter the student's quest for affirmation, contribution, power, purpose, and challenge in the classroom," (p. 37). The learning environment includes the physical layout of the classroom, the way that the teacher uses the space, environmental elements and sensitivities including lighting, as well as the overall atmosphere of the classroom. The teacher's goal is to create an environment that is positive, structured, and supportive for each student. The physical environment should be a place that is flexible with varied types of furniture and arrangements, and areas for quiet individual work as well as areas for group work and collaboration. This supports a variety of ways to engage in flexible and dynamic learning. Flexible seating is a method used to differentiate seating assignments within the learning environment. In the flexible seating model, students choose the type of seating and location in the classroom that will allow them to learn best. Each student chooses for themselves within teacher guidelines.Teachers should be sensitive and alert to ways that the classroom environment supports students' ability to interact with others individually, in small groups, and as a whole class. They should employ classroom management techniques that support a safe and supportive learning environment.

Helping parents learn about differentiated instruction
According to Carol Ann Tomlinson, most parents are eager for their students to learn, grow, succeed and feel accepted in school. Sharing these goals is important. A differentiated classroom may "look different" from what parents expect. The teacher can help them develop a clear, positive understanding of differentiated instruction and how it benefits their children by letting parents know that:

 The goal of differentiated instruction is to make certain that everyone grows in all key skills and knowledge areas, encouraging student to move on from their starting points and to become more independent learners.
 In a differentiated classroom, the teacher closely assesses and monitors skills, knowledge levels, interests to determine effective ways for all students to learn; the teacher's lesson plan is drawn up with those various skills, levels, and interests in mind.
 Differentiated lessons reflect the teacher's best understanding of what will best help a child to grow in understanding and skill at a given moment. That understanding evolves as the course continues, as the child develops, and as parents contribute to teachers' understanding.
 When parents come to school and talk about their children, they share their perspectives with the teacher. The teacher views the student more broadly, specifically in relation to students of the same age and in light of developmental benchmarks. The parent, on the other hand, has a deeper sense of the student's interests, feelings, and changes over time. The combination of the wide-angle lens viewpoint of the teacher with the close up lens of the parents results in a fuller picture for everyone.

Criticism

Education critics on theories of different learning styles have used this as an avenue to also criticize differentiated instruction. One source includes Mike Schmoker of Education Week, who claims that after a lengthy email exchange with an architect of DI, she conceded "There [is] no solid research or school evidence" in support of DI. In Educational Research, John Geake states, "the evidence consistently shows that modifying a teaching approach to cater for differences in learning styles does not result in any improvement in learning outcomes," and that implementing learning styles, citing VAK specifically, does "not reflect how our brains actually learn, nor the
individual differences we observe in classrooms." In Psychological Science for the Public Interest, Pashler et al. note, "the literature fails to provide adequate support for applying learning-style assessments in school settings. Moreover, several studies that used appropriate research designs found evidence that contradicted the learning-styles hypothesis...[W]e feel that the widespread use of learning-style measures in educational settings is unwise and a wasteful use of limited resources."

See also
Tracking (education)

References

Further reading 
 Allan, S. D., & Tomlinson, C. A. (2000). Leadership for differentiating schools and classrooms. Alexandria, VA: Association for Supervision and Curriculum Development.
 
 
 Fountain, Heather. Differentiated Instruction in Art. Worcester, MA: Davis Publications, Inc., 2013.
 Heacox, D. (2002). Differentiating Instruction in the Regular Classroom. Minneapolis, MN: Free Spirit Publishing Inc. 
Jackson, R. (2008) The Differentiation Workbook: A Step-by-step guide to planning lessons that ensure that your students meet or exceed the standards. Washington, DC: Mindsteps
 
 Nunley, K. (2004). Layered curriculum (2nd ed.). Amherst, NH: Brains.org
 Nunley, K. (2006). Differentiating the high school classroom: Solution strategies for 18 common obstacles. Thousand Oaks, CA: Corbin.
 Rebora, A. (2008). Making a difference. Teacher Magazine, 2(1), 26, 28–31.
 Tomlinson, C.A. (2001). How to Differentiate Instruction in Mixed-Ability Classrooms. Virginia: ASCD.
 Smets, W. and Struyven,K. (2018), Aligning with complexity: system-theoretical principles for research on differentiated instruction, Frontline Learning research, 6 (2), doi: 10.14786/flr.v6i2.340

External links
Differentiated Instruction Resources from ASCD
Information on developing RAFT activities
Carol Tomlinson: Differentiation Expert
Differentiated Instruction – Reading Rockets and American Federation of Teachers (AFT)
Differentiating for High Ability Students – Lesson Planet
 A journal paper describing how differentiated lab exercises were used to teach undergraduates programming
Pre-assessment

Teaching
Pedagogy
Educational practices